Binayak Acharya (30 August 1918 – 11 December 1983) was an Indian politician and the Chief Minister of Odisha from 29 December 1976 to 30 April 1977.

See also
 Binayak Acharya College

References

External links
Orissa Chief Ministers List
Orissa Chief Ministers

1918 births
1983 deaths
Chief Ministers of Odisha
Leaders of the Opposition in Odisha
Chief ministers from Indian National Congress
Odisha MLAs 1977–1980
Indian National Congress politicians from Odisha